The 'Southern Blush' mango is a named commercial mango cultivar that originated in south Florida.

History 
Southern Blush originated as a seedling beneath an Eldon tree on the property of Laurence Zill. It received its name for being the most southern planted mango on Zill's property and because it developed a brilliant red blush when exposed to full sun.

The cultivar has been propagated both for nursery stock as a dooryard tree as well as being planted on a limited commercial scale in Florida. It is recognized for its flavor, color, and disease resistance.

A Southern Blush tree is planted in the collection of the Miami-Dade Fruit and Spice Park in Homestead, Florida.

Description 
The fruit are oval in shape, averaging a little over a pound in weight at maturity. The skin is yellow in color with some red blush. The flesh is yellow and sweet, with minimal fiber and containing a monoembryonic seed. The fruit typically ripen from June to July in Florida and the trees are considered good producers with good disease resistance.

The trees are moderately vigorous growers.

See also 
List of mango cultivars

References 

Mango cultivars